Suetes, suêtes, les suêtes, are strong south-east foehn winds on the west coast of Cape Breton Island.
The term "suête" originates from the Acadian French inhabitants of the Chéticamp area  as a contraction  of "sud est" (south-east).

The western edge of the Cape Breton Highlands plateau slopes abruptly down to sea level from approximately  altitude. South-easterly winds lift on the east side of the island and flow across the plateau, frequently accelerating to high velocities on the steep downslope in stable airmass condition.

References

External links
 
 Suetes winds on youtube

Föhn effect
Inverness County, Nova Scotia
Mountain meteorology
Winds